The Diplos Horos is a dance from Messenia in the Peloponnese, Greece. It is a dance where the dancers form a single circle formation into a double via the hand hold. The dance is a simple sta tria in formation but is accompanied by the song Διπλό Χορό Χορεύουμε, Διπλά Τραγούδια Λέμε.

See also
Greek music
Greek dances
Greek folk music
Nisiotika
Sousta
Ikariotikos

Greek dances
Messenia
Greek music